Shiply is a UK-based limited company providing an internet marketplace where transport service requesters may list items they need to move, and where providers of transport services can bid in a reverse auction format.

Concept

The concept employed by Shiply aims to utilise transport capacity that may be wasted in inefficient transport operations and as a consequence enables transport service providers to offer marginal prices to transport service requesters.

Service requesters create accounts and list the items to be transported, stipulating the maximum they are prepared to pay and specifying whether they can be flexible on delivery/pickup dates or need the listed items moved subject to specified date parameters. The transport service providers bid the lowest amount they would accept to perform the transport service. A user feedback system is enabled in order to keep track of the reputation of the transport service providers and transport service requesters, this allows the transport service requesters the ability to frame their procurement decision on factors other than solely price.

Registration is free for both transport service providers and transport service requesters. Transport service providers' bids are subject to a transaction based tiered fee structure, (in the UK this is between 3.9% and 9.9% -dependent on the amount of the transaction-with a minimum fee of £6) the cost of which is borne by the transport service requesters. Transport service requesters may also be subject to an auction service fee. This fee amount is dependent on the shipment in question and is displayed before the transport service requester accepts a bid.

In September 2010 Shiply had 17,500 transport service provider accounts, and helped voice their concerns over trade-related issues.

History

Formation 
Shiply was founded in March 2008 by Robert Matthams, in Manchester. He has said he had the idea of this business concept when a pool table he ordered was delivered to his university in Manchester. The driver complained that he would have to make the return journey to London empty, thereby wasting fuel and his own resources.

eBay
In March 2009 Shiply launched an eBay widget to be inserted by sellers into eBay auction listings. This - now part of the item listing process - gives prospective eBay bidders the option to import items they have won - or on which they are currently bidding - into Shiply.com. The widget allows them to enter their delivery post code and then Shiply imports other pertinent information into their listing. In January 2011, Shiply signed an exclusive agreement with eBay Motors UK, becoming the site’s transport partner. At that time, 50% of its business came from eBay users.

Operations

Area covered
Initially, only haulage companies from UK participated in the marketplace. In October 2009, the company expanded in Germany, opening a German website and allowing German haulage companies. In August 2010, when the company expanded to France, Italy, the Netherlands and Spain, 15% of shipments on Shiply already crossed national borders and 10% of its business came from the German website.

Controversies

Legal dispute 
On 24 February 2011 uShip and Shiply jointly announced a settlement regarding uShip's claims of trademark and copyright infringement. As part of the settlement, Shiply has agreed to redesign some parts of its web site, and pay an amount in compensation to uShip.

Misleading Advertising 

On 19 December 2012, UK's ASA published an adjudication against Shiply Ltd about misleading advertising on www.shiply.com.
	
The ASA investigated whether www.shiply.com made it sufficiently clear that a credit policy applied to cancellations. The ASA concluded:

"The home page breached CAP Code (Edition 12) rules 3.1 and 3.3 (Misleading advertising), 3.9 and 3.10 (Qualification)."
"Because of Shiply Ltd’s continued non compliance we took the decision to place the details for www.shiply.com on the ASA section of the website on 14 October 2013. Shiply Ltd’s details shall remain in place until such time as www.shiply.com clearly and prominently states the significant condition of its cancellation policy on its home page."

Shiply Ltd's details are no longer on the ASA section of the website.

Reception
Shiply has been covered in the UK media as successful start-up business during recession times, as a provider of cheap shipping alternatives, and as an innovative idea for tackling climate change.

Awards
In 2010 Shiply was awarded the Shell Springboard Climate Change Innovation Prize, and was runner-up in the Dutch Postcode Lottery’s 2010 Green Challenge competition.

See also 
 uShip
 AnyVan
 Reverse auction

References

External links

Online marketplaces of the United Kingdom
Low-carbon economy